Bronfman is a surname. The name is Yiddish in origin and originally referred to a dealer in distilled liquor (Yiddish bronfn).

Notable people with the surname include:

Bronfman family, Jewish-Canadian-American, owners of Seagram
Charles Bronfman (born 1931) Canadian-American businessman and son of Samuel
Edgar Bronfman Sr. (1929–2013), Canadian-American businessman and former Seagram CEO; son of Samuel
Edgar Bronfman Jr. (born 1955), American businessman and former Seagram CEO; son of Edgar Sr.
Edward Bronfman (1927–2005)
Matthew Bronfman (born 1959), American businessman, entrepreneur and philanthropist; son of Edgar Sr.
Phyllis Lambert (born 1927), Canadian architect and daughter of Edgar Sr.
Samuel Bronfman (1889–1971), Bessarabia born founder of Canadian business family
Saidye Rosner Bronfman (1897–1995), wife of Samuel
 (born 1932), Moldavian Soviet engineer, mechanic, inventor; later migrated to Israel
Roman Bronfman (born 1954), Ukraine-born Israeli politician
Yefim Bronfman (born 1958), Uzbek-born Israeli-American pianist

Jewish surnames
Yiddish-language surnames